Climacosphenia is a genus of marine pennate diatoms in the order Fragilariophyceae.

References

External links 
 

 
 
 

Diatom genera

Fragilariophyceae
Taxa named by Christian Gottfried Ehrenberg